HMS Grappler was an Albacore-class gunboat of the Royal Navy.  She served on what is now the British Columbia Coast from 1859 until sold into commercial service in 1868.  She sank with significant loss of life as result of a fire in 1883.

Naval service
The Grappler was one of about 100 Albacore-class gunboats that the Admiralty had built to meet the needs of the Crimean War.  Like the others of her class, she was completed as that war ended. The Admiralty dispatched her, along with her sister ship, to British Columbia following the Fraser Canyon Gold Rush in 1858. She sailed from England in August 1859 and reached Esquimalt nearly a year later on July 12, 1860.
HMS Grappler, shown here in later service as a packet steamer, brought the first settlers to the Comox Valley in 1862.

Vancouver Island service
On the Pacific Station Grappler played an important role in the early history of the Colony of Vancouver Island. Under the command of Lieutenant Edmund Hope Verney, Grappler transported the first 35 British settlers to a new settlement at Comox on 2 October 1862 at the request of Governor James Douglas. She continued to act as a transport for the settlement before other transport was available. She also helped enforce the regulation of the liquor trade in the colony. Her small size, steam power, and shallow draft made her useful as a lighthouse tender, for rescue, and for laying navigation buoys. however  She and Forward were involved in the Lemalchi incident in the spring of 1863 when they hunted down and captured natives believed to have murdered some Gulf Island settlers. Forward used her guns to level a village on Kuper Island; she then transported her captives to Victoria where they were tried and hanged.

Civilian service and fate
Grappler was paid off on 13 May 1865 and sold for $2,400 in 1868.  She was modified by the addition of deck house and put into commercial service for the next 15 years.

On 29 April 1883, while in Discovery Passage about 4 miles south of Seymour Narrows, a fire was discovered in her boiler room.  There were only two lifeboats aboard, one of which overturned.  There were 36 survivors.  Because the ship's records were lost, the number who perished in the sinking is uncertain but is believed to be between 70 and 90.  At an inquest which followed, it was found that the vessel was not licensed to carry passengers aboard and the owners had failed to make provisions for their safety. Grappler was on a voyage from the Puget South to the Alaska Territory.

See also
Grappler Sound

External links
 Watercolour from October 1865 of HMS Grappler by William Edward Atkins at the National Maritime Museum, Greenwich.
 Grappler after dismantling, BC Archives

Sources
HMS Grappler at the Historic Shipping web site

References

1856 ships
Albacore-class gunboats (1855)
Victorian-era gunboats of the United Kingdom
Ships built by the Blackwall Yard
Shipwrecks of the British Columbia coast
History of Vancouver Island
Maritime incidents in April 1883